Lake Kissimmee State Park is a 5,930-acre (24 km2) Florida State Park located north of State Road 60,  east of Lake Wales. It contains floodplain, forest, prairie, hammock, flatwoods and Lakes Kissimmee, Tiger, and Rosalie. The park is home to 50 species of plants and animals that are either threatened, of special concern or endangered.

Activities include boating, canoeing, kayaking and fishing as well as camping, hiking, biking, horseback riding trails, and nature viewing. Among the wildlife of the park are two hundred species of birds, including the bald eagle, snail kite and whooping crane. Other animals are bobcat, grey fox and wild turkey, as well as white-tailed deer, sandhill crane, fox squirrel and otter.
.  
The park's sixty full facility campsites are located in an oak hammock. There are two primitive campsites and a youth camping area. More than 30,000 acres (120 km2) of lakes are accessible from the park. The park is open from 7:00 am till sundown year-round. The cow camp is open 9:30 a.m. to 4:30 p.m. on weekends and holidays from October through May 1.

Cow Camp
Cow Camp is a living history site that depicts an 1876 cattle camp, including Florida scrub cattle. Local cattlemen were commonly referred to as Cracker Cowboys or "Cow Hunters". Cow Camp is open on weekends and holidays from the first weekend in October through May 1 
.

.

Gallery

References

External links
 Lake Kissimmee State Park at Florida State Parks
 Lake Kissimmee State Park at State Parks
 Lake Kissimmee State Park at Absolutely Florida
 Lake Kissimmee State Park at Wildernet
 Lake Kissimmee SP Unit Management Plan at Florida DEP

Parks in Polk County, Florida
State parks of Florida
Museums in Polk County, Florida
Living museums in Florida
Rural history museums in Florida